Laken Paitai (born 19 November 2000) is a New Zealand rugby league footballer who plays as a  for the New Zealand Warriors in the NRL Women's Premiership and the Burleigh Bears in the QRL Women's Premiership.

Background
Born in Otahuhu, New Zealand, Paitai grew up in Gladstone, Queensland, where she played her junior rugby league for Valleys Gladstone.

Playing career
In 2018 and 2019, while playing for the Burleigh Bears, Paitai represented South East Queensland at the Women's National Championships. On 111 October 2019, she represented the Prime Minister's XIII in their 22–14 win over Fiji.

In September 2020, Paitai joined the New Zealand Warriors NRL Women's Premiership squad. In Round 3 of the 2020 NRLW season, she made her debut for the Warriors in a 22–10 win over the St George Illawarra Dragons.

References

External links
New Zealand Warriors profile

2000 births
Living people
New Zealand female rugby league players
Rugby league centres
New Zealand Warriors (NRLW) players